"You Can Depend on Me" is a song written by Charles Carpenter, Louis Dunlap and Earl "Fatha" Hines. and first recorded by Louis Armstrong (1931 and 1951). 
It should not be confused with the song of the same name, "(You Can) Depend on Me," recorded by Smokey Robinson and The Miracles in 1959.

Other recorded versions
The song has been recorded and performed by several people, including:
Count Basie (1939), 
Earl Hines himself (1940)
Lester Young (1956)
Nat King Cole (1957)
Brenda Lee (1961). Lee's "You Can Depend on Me" reached No.6 on the Billboard Pop Singles chart in May 1961. The single crossed over to the Hot R&B Sides chart, where it reached No. 25. This recording was featured on Lee's 1962 album Brenda, That's All.

Influences
Recorded in 1949, the notable Lennie Tristano contrafact "Wow" is based on the chord changes to You Can Depend on Me.

References

External links
BMI Work #1712327, "You Can Depend on Me"

1961 singles
Brenda Lee songs
1961 songs
Decca Records singles